The list of cast members who have appeared as recurring cast members in Stanley Kubrick films has been relatively short. Some of the actors who have appeared in more than one film are listed in the table included in this section. The individual films may be consulted for the precise casting details in specific films.

Table of recurring cast members
A few of these are uncredited in some of their roles.

James Harris worked as a co-producer and co-writer with Kubrick on four movies, but only his uncredited acting cameos are listed here.

Although the Kubrick sisters' contributions to their father's movies as music composer and art direction are credited under pseudonyms,
their acting cameos are uncredited. Kubrick's spouse Christiane Kubrick is credited in Paths of Glory as Christiane Harlan.

Quilty's "Dr. Zempf" and Peter Sellers role as Doctor Strangelove
Lolita has a scene lasting six minutes in which Quilty disguises himself as a German-accented high school psychologist named Dr. Zempf who persuades Humbert to allow Lolita more personal freedom so that she can act in the high school play (which is written by Quilty and produced with some supervision from him). This is modified from a scene in the novel in which there is a similar conversation with a genuine female school psychologist. The film version of this scene was sufficiently memorable that Edward Albee incorporated it into his stage adaptation of Lolita.

Numerous observers have seen similarities between Peter Sellers' performance of Quilty-as-Zempf and his subsequent role in Stanley Kubrick's next film as Doctor Strangelove. Stanley Kubrick himself in an interview with Michel Ciment described both characters as "parodies of movie clichés of Nazis". Commenting elsewhere on the characters, Ciment writes "Peter Sellers prefigured his creation of Dr Strangelove, particularly in the role of Dr Zempf, the school psychologist whose thick German accent recalls that of the mad professor (note Kubrick's ambiguous feelings towards Germany, his admiration for its culture... his fear of its demonstrations of power...)". Thomas Allen Nelson has said that in this part of his performance, "Sellers twists his conception of Quilty toward that neo-Nazi monster, who will roll out of the cavernous shadows of Dr. Strangelove", later noting that Zempf "exaggerates Humbert's European pomposity through his psychobabble and German anality." The Kubrick interview has been commented by Geoffrey Cocks, author of a controversial book on the impact of the Holocaust on Kubrick's overall work, who notes that "Dr. Strangelove himself... is the mechanical chimera of modern horror."

Other observers of this similarity include Internet film critic Tim Dirks who has also noted that Sellers's smooth German-like accent and the chair-bound pose in this scene are similar to that of Dr. Strangelove. Finally, Barbara Wyllie, writing in Julian Connelly's anthology The Cambridge Companion to Nabokov, speaks of "Quilty's visit to the house in Beardsley, masquerading as Dr. Zempf, a German psychologist (a Sellers character that prefigures Dr. Strangelove in Kubrick's film of 1964)."

References

Films directed by Stanley Kubrick
Stanley Kubrick
Kubrick
Kubrick